A common visa exists since the end of 2010 for the territories of Aruba, Curaçao, Sint Maarten (landen within the Kingdom) and the Caribbean Netherlands (Bonaire, Sint Eustatius and Saba, which are part of the country the Netherlands) which form together the territory of the Kingdom of the Netherlands in the Caribbean. The visa is not valid for the European part of the Netherlands, which is part of the Schengen Area.

Visa 

A standard visa is valid for all 6 islands and allows multiple entry for a maximum period of 90 days within 180 days. The maximum uninterrupted stay in one of the individual countries is 30 days. The visa is not valid for the European part of the Netherlands. Application takes place at the consular representations of the Kingdom and the main visiting country has to be indicated. The basis for evaluation of the evaluation of the application in the main visiting country is however the same for the whole area. Entry for longer periods is arranged by the different countries separately.

History 
The two Caribbean "countries" within the Kingdom of the Netherlands were Aruba and the Netherlands Antilles. They each had their own visa policy and thus a list of countries from which nationals could enter without a visa. Through consultation between all countries in the Kingdom the requirements showed strong similarities; they were based on the visa free lists for the Schengen Area, extended with countries in the Caribbean. Upon the Dissolution of the Netherlands Antilles on 10 October 2010, the common visa system was introduced for all territories of the Kingdom in the Caribbean: Aruba, Curaçao, Sint Maarten as well as Bonaire, Sint Eustatius and Saba. The maximum period of stay is 3 months for all countries on the visa-free list for which full reciprocity is in place; for other countries the maximum period is 30 days.

Visa policy map

Visa-free entry 
Nationals of the following countries and territories do not need a visa for a stay for up to 90 days in Aruba, Curaçao, Sint Maarten and the Caribbean Netherlands.

Furthermore, the following groups are exempted from the visa requirement:
 Travelers transiting an airport in Aruba between 7:00 and 23:00, in Sint Maarten on the same day, and in the other territories for up to 48 hours (except nationals of Haiti transiting an airport in Curaçao);
 Travelers transiting by land from Sint Maarten to Saint Martin, holding a visa for Saint Martin (if required) and a hotel reservation;
 Cruise ship passengers for up to 24 hours in Aruba and 48 hours in the other territories;
 The crew of a ship or aircraft for up to 48 hours;
 Holders of a United Nations laissez-passer;
 Diplomats accredited to the whole Kingdom of the Netherlands;
 Holders of diplomatic, service/official and special passports of Tunisia and Turkey, holders of diplomatic and service/official passports of Bolivia, Georgia, Indonesia, Jamaica, Malawi, Morocco and Thailand, and holders of diplomatic passports of Chad, Kazakhstan, Pakistan, Russia and Senegal;
 Holders of a refugee or stateless person travel document issued by the Kingdom of the Netherlands, or in accordance with the 1951 Convention relating to the Status of Refugees, refugee travel document or certificate of identity issued by Canada, advance parole travel document or refugee travel document issued by the United States (Form I-571).

Dutch nationals 
Although all Dutch nationals have the right of abode in the European Netherlands, right of abode in the Dutch Caribbean is limited to those who have a connection to the region. Other Dutch can enter the region visa-free for a maximum of 6 months. The identity card BES and the cedula of Aruba, Curaçao and Sint Maarten are valid for entering Bonaire, Sint Eustatius or Saba, but the Dutch identity card is not.

Substitute visas
Nationals of any country who are not otherwise visa exempted can enter Aruba, Curaçao, Sint Maarten and the Caribbean Netherlands for a maximum of 90 days provided holding a valid visa or residence permit for any part of the Kingdom of the Netherlands, a Schengen country, Ireland or the United Kingdom, or a residence permit for Canada, the United States, the French overseas departments (French Guiana, Guadeloupe, Martinique, Mayotte and Réunion) or the French overseas collectivities of Saint Barthélemy and Saint Martin.

Holders of a visa for Saint Martin do not need a visa for Sint Maarten, but need a visa for the other territories (if not otherwise exempt).

In addition, nationals of the following countries can enter provided holding a valid visa for Canada or the United States.

Summary of visa exemptions

See also

 Visa policy of the Schengen Area
 Dutch nationality law

References

Netherlands Kingdom in the Caribbean
Government in the Dutch Caribbean